Baksan may refer to:
Baksan (town), in the Kabardino-Balkarian Republic, Russia
Baksan Urban Okrug, a municipality which incorporates Baksan (town) 
Baksan (river), in the Kabardino-Balkarian Republic, Russia
Baksan Neutrino Observatory

See also
Baksan (inhabited locality), a list of places bearing the name
Baksan Hydroelectric Power Station, a power station on the Baksan River in the Kabardino-Balkarian Republic, Russia
Baksansky (disambiguation)